Nesopupa wesleyana is a species of very small, air-breathing land snail, a terrestrial pulmonate gastropod mollusk in the family Vertiginidae, the whorl snails. This species is endemic to Hawaii, the United States.

References

Vertiginidae
Molluscs of Hawaii
Endemic fauna of Hawaii
Gastropods described in 1904
Taxa named by César Marie Félix Ancey
Taxonomy articles created by Polbot